Jessica Dal Pos (born 20 September 1993) is an Australian rules footballer playing for Carlton in the AFL Women's competition. She previously played for Greater Western Sydney, being one of their four priority selections prior to the 2016 AFL Women's draft.

Junior and state league
Her parents considered Dal Pos too small to play against the boys in under-12 football, and there was no local team for girls. She returned to football in the girls' and women's teams of the Darebin Falcons at 15, and went on to play in four Victorian Women's Football League premierships.

Recognizing improvement in her football over the following two years,  selected Dal Pos for the AFL exhibition series during 2015.

Prior to the 2016 AFL Women's draft, Dal Pos approached Greater Western Sydney, chose to move to Sydney from Melbourne, and negotiated selection as a priority pick.

AFL Women's career
Dal Pos finished the 2017 season with the second most tackles and centre clearances, and the third most clearances in the league. As well as finishing third for the 2017 AFLW Players' Most Courageous Award, Dal Pos was listed in the 2017 All-Australian team. She was awarded the Gabrielle Trainor Medal as  best and fairest.

Greater Western Sydney signed Dal Pos for the 2018 season during the trade period in May 2017.

It was revealed that Dal Pos was looking to leave the Giants in May 2021 because she wanted to move to Victoria to finish a paramedics course. The following month she was traded to Carlton.

Statistics
 Statistics are correct to the end of the 2017 season

|- style="background-color: #EAEAEA"
! scope="row" style="text-align:center" | 2017
|
| 7 || 8 || 1 || 0 || 79 || 18 || 97 || 14 || 49 || 0.1 || 0.0 || 11.3 || 2.6 || 13.9 || 2.0 || 7.0
|- class="sortbottom"
! colspan=3| Career
! 8
! 1
! 0
! 79
! 18
! 97
! 14
! 49
! 0.1
! 0.0
! 11.3
! 2.6
! 13.9
! 2.0
! 7.0
|}

References

External links

·

Living people
1993 births
Greater Western Sydney Giants (AFLW) players
Australian rules footballers from Victoria (Australia)
All-Australians (AFL Women's)
Darebin Falcons players
Carlton Football Club (AFLW) players